Eyewitness is a 1999 American short documentary film directed by Bert Van Bork. It was nominated for an Academy Award for Best Documentary Short. The explored the lives of three artists forced to work in secret while living in Nazi death camps: Jan Komski, Dinah Gottliebova and Felix Nussbaum, and who witnessed and painted the horrors of the Holocaust.

References

External links

Eyewitness at Seventh Art Releasing

1990s short documentary films
1999 films
American short documentary films
American independent films
Documentary films about the Holocaust
Documentary films about painters
1999 independent films
1990s English-language films
1990s American films